Bangaru Gaajulu is a 1968 Indian Telugu-language drama film directed by C. S. Rao from a story written by Rajasri. Produced by Tammareddy Krishna Murthy, it stars Akkineni Nageswara Rao, Bharathi, and Vijaya Nirmala with the music composed by T. Chalapathi Rao. Released on 22 August 1968, the film won Nandi Awards from the Government of Andhra Pradesh, including Third Best Feature Film and Best Story Writer (Rajasri).

Plot
The film begins with Ramu and Radha who are loving, adoring, and inseparable. Ramu works as a lorry driver in a company owned by Raoji malicious, feigning as honorable. He has an evil eye on Radha and tries to molest her when Avataram, a guy allied to Ramu, rescues her. Thereafter, Ramu fixes an alliance for Radha and aspires to gift her golden bangles. Meanwhile, Raoji falsifies Radha, and makes her land at his residence, while escaping from him, she jumps into a river. Being cognizant of it, enraged Ramu moves to slay him. At the same time, Raoji's illegal racket is caught by Police, so, he slaughters his partner Paul, counterfeits his body as his own, and indicts Ramu in the crime. Terror-stricken Ramu flees and becomes a wanderer in search of Radha. Thereupon, he rescues a charming girl Sarada unknowingly, the sister of Avataram. Now Ramu accommodates them as Ravi, turns into a taxi driver, and falls for Sarada. Just after, a woman falls under his taxi, one that resembles Radha. Here, Ramu saves her by donating his blood when he learns from a samaritan Raja Rao that she is his daughter and wife of Inspector Chandra Shekar, whose name is Radha too. Anguished, Ramu repudiates it when commiserate Radha enacts as his sister. Right now, Ramu determines to reacquire the golden bangles for which he strives. Since Ramu becomes a frequent visitor and his closeness towards Radha makes Chandra Shekar suspect their relationship. During this plight, Raja Rao leaves for pilgrimage. Meanwhile, Raoji alters his identity as Prakash a friend of Chandra Shekar, and gets shocked by seeing Ramu and Radha. Eventually, Chandra Shekar realizes Ramu is an absconded criminal and seizes him. At this juncture, Raoji kidnaps Radha when Ramu absconds, extricates Radha, and proves his innocence with the help of Sarada and Avataram. At last, a flabbergasted Raja Rao arrives with Radha, one, and affirms them as twins. Finally, the movie ends on a happy note with Ramu bestowing the golden bangles to his sisters.

Cast

Production
C. S. Rao scripted the film from the original story by Rajasri. The film has editing by Akkineni Sanjeev and cinematography by Kamal Ghosh. Art was handled by G. V. Subba Rao and choreography was by K. S. Reddy.

Soundtrack
Music composed by T. Chalapathi Rao. The lyrics were written by Dasarathi, C. Narayana Reddy, Kosaraju, and Arudra with vocals by Ghantasala, P. Susheela, L. R. Eswari, Madhavapeddi Satyam, and Vasantha.

Awards
Nandi Awards
 Third Best Feature Film - Bronze - T. G. Krishnamurthy
 Second Best Story Writer - Rajasri

References

External links
 

1960s Telugu-language films
1968 films
Films scored by T. Chalapathi Rao
Films directed by C. S. Rao
Nandi Award winners